František Kiehlmann (5 June 1901 – 20 May 1988) was a Czech hurdler. He competed in the men's 400 metres hurdles at the 1920 Summer Olympics.

References

1901 births
1988 deaths
Athletes (track and field) at the 1920 Summer Olympics
Czech male hurdlers
Olympic athletes of Czechoslovakia
Place of birth missing